Stephen II may refer to:

 Stephen II of Iberia (died c. 650), prince of Iberia (Kartli, eastern Georgia)
 Pope-elect Stephen (died 752), considered (from the 16th century to 1960) a valid pope under the name Stephen II
 Pope Stephen II (died 757), his successor, called Stephen III until 1961
 Stephen II of Troyes (died 1047)
 Stephen II of Croatia (died 1091), King of Croatia
 Stephen II, Count of Sponheim (died 1096)
 Stephen II of Hungary (1101–1131), King of Hungary and Croatia
 Stephen II, Ban of Bosnia (died 1353), of the House of Kotromanić
 Stephen II, Duke of Bavaria (1319–75)
 Stephen II of Moldavia (died 1447), Prince (Voivode) of Moldavia

eo:Stefano#Regantoj